"Kærligheden kalder" is the debut single by Danish boyband Lighthouse X. The song was released as a digital download in Denmark on 13 October 2014 through North-East Production. The song was released as the lead single from their debut self-titled EP. The song peaked to number 37 on the Danish Singles Chart.

Track listing

Chart performance

Weekly charts

Release history

References

2014 debut singles
2014 songs
Lighthouse X songs